The Grand Prix of Sochi was a road cycling stage race held annually in Sochi, Russia until 2015. It was held as part of the UCI Europe Tour as a 2.2 category race. No rider has had more than one victory.

Past winners

References

External links

UCI Europe Tour races
Recurring sporting events established in 2005
Cycle races in Russia
2005 establishments in Russia
Sports competitions in Sochi
Recurring sporting events disestablished in 2015
2015 disestablishments in Russia